Julius William Gates (born June 14, 1941) is a retired United States Army soldier who served as the eighth Sergeant Major of the Army. He was sworn in during July 1987 and served until his term ended four years later in June 1991.

Early life
Gates was born in North Carolina on June 14, 1953.

Military career
Gates entered the United States Army on August 12, 1958, and attended initial training at Fort Jackson, South Carolina. He served three tours in Germany, two combat tours in Vietnam, and a tour in the Republic of Korea.

Gates' stateside assignments include duty with the 101st Airborne Division at Fort Campbell, Kentucky, the United States Army Infantry School at Fort Benning, Georgia, the 1st Ranger Battalion at Fort Stewart, Georgia, the Virginia Military Institute of Lexington, Virginia and Fort Bliss, Texas. Gates served in numerous non-commissioned officer leadership positions, including as first Commandant of the 24th Infantry Division NCO Academy at Fort Stewart, Georgia. Before being appointed as the Sergeant Major of the Army he served as command sergeant major of the 2d Armored Division (Forward), the 3d Infantry Division (Mechanized), the U.S. Army Sergeants Major Academy, and of United States Forces Korea.

Awards and decorations

 10 Service stripes.
2005 recipient of the Doughboy Award from the National Infantry Association.

References

1941 births
Living people
United States Army personnel of the Vietnam War
Recipients of the Legion of Merit
Recipients of the Distinguished Service Medal (US Army)
People from North Carolina
Recipients of the Air Medal
Recipients of the Defense Superior Service Medal
Sergeants Major of the Army